Germinal Peiro (born September 15, 1953 in Lézignan-Corbières, Aude) Is a French politician who was a member of the National Assembly of France. He represented Dordogne's 4th constituency from 1997 to 2017 as a member of the Socialiste, radical, citoyen et divers gauche.

He was Mayor of Castelnaud-la-Chapelle from 14 March 1983 to 4 April 2014.

References

1953 births
Living people
People from Aude
Socialist Party (France) politicians
Mayors of places in Nouvelle-Aquitaine
Deputies of the 12th National Assembly of the French Fifth Republic
Deputies of the 13th National Assembly of the French Fifth Republic
Deputies of the 14th National Assembly of the French Fifth Republic
Members of Parliament for Dordogne